Jan Sychra (born 21 March 1969) is a Czech sport shooter. At the 2012 Summer Olympics he competed in the Men's skeet, finishing in 5th place.

Records

References

External links

1969 births
Living people
Skeet shooters
Czech male sport shooters
Olympic shooters of the Czech Republic
Shooters at the 1996 Summer Olympics
Shooters at the 2004 Summer Olympics
Shooters at the 2008 Summer Olympics
Shooters at the 2012 Summer Olympics
Sportspeople from Brno
Shooters at the 2015 European Games
European Games competitors for the Czech Republic